Wu Yibing was the defending champion but lost in the second round to Li Zhe.

Blaž Kavčič won the title after defeating Hiroki Moriya 6–1, 7–6(7–1) in the final.

Seeds

Draw

Finals

Top half

Bottom half

References
Main Draw
Qualifying Draw

Shanghai Challenger - Singles
2018 Singles